Ngunnawal is a suburb in the district of Gungahlin in Canberra, Australia. The suburb is named in tribute to the Ngunnawal people, the original inhabitants of the area. The suburb was gazetted on 24 April 1992. Ngunnawal is adjacent to the suburbs of Nicholls, Casey, Moncrieff, Amaroo and Gungahlin. It is bounded by Gungahlin Drive, Horse Park Drive, Gundaroo Drive and Mirrabei Drive. Ginninderra Creek is situated near Ngunnawal's eastern boundary. The suburb is located approximately 4 km from the Gungahlin Town Centre and about 13 km from the centre of Canberra.

Place names
Ngunnawal's place names relate to indigenous Australian culture. For example:
 Violet's Park on Marungul Avenue was named after Ngunnawal elder Josephine Violet Bulger in 1993. A commemorative artwork titled Meeting Place was installed in 2017 in honour of Violet's life and community contributions. 
 Wanganeen Ave is named after Ken Wanganeen, a prominent Aboriginal Affairs activist.
 Jabanungga Avenue, one of the suburb's connector roads, bears the name of Robert Jabanungga, a local Aboriginal dancer and musician.
 Yerra Court is named after the Ngunnawal language word for "swim"
 Bural Court is named after the Ngunnawal language word for "day"
 Mundawari Circuit is named after the Ngunnawal language word for "bandicoot"
 Bargang Crescent is named after the Ngunnawal language word for "yellow box gum"

Additionally, Anthony Rolfe Drive is named after Anthony Rolfe, who was instrumental in developing the "Tea gardens" homestead, and the Gold Creek Homestead, in what is now Ngunnawal.

Community facilities

Education 
The following educational facilities are in Ngunnawal:
 Ngunnawal Preschool
 Ngunnawal Primary School (which also hosts a Koori preschool)

Shops 

There are two small shopping centres in Ngunnawal. Ngunnawal Shopping Centre is located at the corner of Wanganeen Avenue and Jabanungga Avenue and provides a Spar supermarket, a bakery, a takeaway shop, a pharmacy, a gym, and a medical clinic with allied health facilities. An IGA store is located in the eastern area of Ngunnawal on Mirrabei Drive.

Libraries 
The Arabanoo Street Library is located in Ngunnawal.

Housing 
Ngunnawal primarily consists of residential property. A housing estate called "Broadview Estate" is located in the northwestern edge of Ngunnawal. There is a retirement village called "The Grove" in Ngunnawal.

Attractions 

The Gold Creek Homestead is located in Ngunnawal.

Churches and schools 
New Life Presbyterian Church is located on 107 Wanganeen Avenue.

Ngunnawal Primary School is located on Unaipon Avenue.

Geology

The Ngunnawal suburb is sited on the Canberra Formation and bedrock laided down during the late middle Silurian age. The area was studied in more detail than many other parts of Canberra by J P Ceplecha from the ANU in 1971.

Most of Ngunnawal is based on slaty shale and mudstone. In the North West corner is found dacite and quartz andesite. A layer of tuff is formed into a Vee shaped surface exposure in the western half of the suburb. A smaller N shaped outcrop of tuff is found in the east corner. A crook shaped outcrop of ashstone is exposed just to the east of the Vee.

The structure of the rock has been determined by folding. The folds are aligned north-north east and plunge to the south south west. An anticline determines the point of the Vee pointing south south west. Another anticline determines the end of the crook shape. A syncline determines the top of the crook. The Deakin Fault runs roughly parallel to the fold axes on the south east side along Ginninderra Creek.

Footnotes

Suburbs of Canberra
Suburbs in Australia